Biathlon at the 2002 Winter Olympics consisted of eight biathlon events. They were held at Soldier Hollow.  The events began on 11 February and ended on 20 February 2002. For the first time since 1992, the biathlon program expanded. A new race type, the pursuit (for both men and women) was added, the first new race type since the debut of the sprint in 1980.

Medal summary
Seven nations won medals in biathlon, with Germany winning the most (3 gold, 5 silver, 1 bronze), while Norway led the medal table with 4 gold medals. These four all involved Ole Einar Bjørndalen, who won each of the three men's individual events, as well as participating in the gold-medal winning relay team. Kati Wilhelm was the most successful athlete in the women's competition, taking two golds and a silver.

Medal table

Men's events

Women's events

Participating nations
Thirty-four nations sent biathletes to compete in the events. Below is a list of the competing nations; in parentheses are the number of national competitors. Chile and Croatia made their Olympic debuts in the sport, with one athlete each.

See also
Biathlon at the 2002 Winter Paralympics

References

External links
Official Results Book – Biathlon

 
2002 in biathlon
2002 Winter Olympics events
2002
Biathlon competitions in the United States